765 Mattiaca is a minor planet orbiting the Sun. Photometric observations made in 2011–2012 at the Organ Mesa Observatory in Las Cruces, New Mexico produced an irregular light curve and a period of 3.4640 ± 0.0001 hours with a brightness variation of 0.09 ± 0.01 in magnitude. Mattiacum was the Latin name for the city of Wiesbaden, Germany, birthplace of the discoverer.

References

External links
 
 

Background asteroids
Mattiaca
19130926
Mattiaca